Il Destino are an English classical crossover duo composed of tenor Jon Christos and Musical theatre performer Adam Lacey.

Jon Christos is a classically trained tenor, best known for an album of operatically-styled crossover music Northern Light, making numerous appearances on Stage (theatre), Television and Radio and performances for the Prince of Wales.

Adam Lacey is a singer known for his work in Musical theatre. 
In 2013 he performed at the Close Encounters Prom at Jodrell Bank alongside the Hallé Orchestra conducted by Steven Bell in celebration of Sir Bernard Lovell’s 100th birthday.

They first met whilst individually performing for The Inspiration Awards at Cadogan Hall London in 2012 and have since been in demand at Music festivals Warner Leisure Hotels and entertaining on Cruise ships. 
In March 2017 they undertook an extensive Fred. Olsen & Co. World Cruise to South East Asia and the South Pacific.

References

 

Crossover (music)
English musical duos
Opera crossover singers